Helina is a very large genus from the fly family Muscidae.

Fungal species Strongwellsea selandia and Strongwellsea gefion from (genus Strongwellsea, order Entomophthorales) infects adult flies from genus Helina in Denmark.

Species

H. abdominalis (Zetterstedt, 1846)
H. abiens (Stein, 1898)
H. algonquina Malloch, 1922
H. allotalla (Meigen, 1830)
H. annosa (Zetterstedt, 1838)
H. arctata Collin, 1953
H. atricolor (Fallén, 1825)
H. baoshanensis Xue & Li, 2000
H. barpana (Walker, 1849)
H. bicolorata (Malloch and Lovett, 1919)
H. bispinosa Malloch, 1920
H. bohemani (Ringdahl, 1916)
H. calceata (Rondani, 1866)
H. canadensis Snyder, 1949
H. caneo Snyder, 1941
H. celsa (Harris, 1780)
H. ciliatocosta (Zetterstedt, 1845)
H. cilipes (Schnabl, 1902)
H. cinerella (van der Wulp, 1867)
H. concolor (Czerny, 1900)
H. confinis (Fallén, 1825)
H. consimilata Malloch, 1920
H. consimilis (Fallén, 1825)
H. copiosa (van der Wulp, 1896)
H. cothurnata (Rondani, 1866)
H. crinita Collin, 1953
H. cruciata Snyder, 1941
H. depuncta (Fallén, 1825)
H. discreta (van der Wulp, 1896)
H. duplex (Stein, 1900)
H. erecta Harris
H. evecta (Harris, 1780)
H. exilis (Stein, 1920)
H. flavisquama (Zetterstedt, 1849)
H. floridensis Snyder, 1949
H. fratercula (Zetterstedt, 1845)
H. fulvisquama (Zetterstedt, 1845)
H. garretti Snyder, 1949
H. griseogaster Snyder, 1949
H. humilis (Stein, 1920)
H. impuncta (Fallén, 1825)
H. intermedia (Villeneuve, 1899)
H. johnsoni Malloch, 1920
H. keremeosa Snyder, 1949
H. lasiophthalma (Macquart, 1835)
H. lasiosterna Snyder, 1941
H. latitarsis Ringdahl, 1924
H. laxifrons (Zetterstedt, 1860)
H. linearis Malloch, 1920
H. longicornis (Zetterstedt, 1838)
H. luteisquama (Zetterstedt, 1845)
H. maculipennis (Zetterstedt, 1845)
H. marguerita Snyder, 1949
H. meraca (van der Wulp, 1896)
H. mulcata (Giglio-tos, 1893)
H. multiseriata Malloch, 1922
H. nigribasis Malloch, 1920
H. nigripennis (Walker, 1849)
H. nigrita Malloch, 1920
H. nudibasis Snyder, 1949
H. obscurata (Meigen, 1826)
H. obscuratoides (Schnabl, 1887)
H. obscurinervis (Stein, 1898)
H. orbitaseta (Stein, 1898)
H. oregonensis (Malloch and Lovett, 1919)
H. parcepilosa (Stein, 1907)
H. parvula (van der Wulp, 1896)
H. pectinata (Johannsen, 1916)
H. pertusa (Meigen, 1826)
H. platykarenos Huckett, 1966
H. polychaeta Huckett, 1966
H. procedens (Walker, 1861)
H. protuberans (Zetterstedt, 1845)
H. pubescens (Stein, 1893)
H. pubiseta (Zetterstedt, 1845)
H. pulchella (Ringdahl, 1918)
H. quadrinotata (Meigen, 1826)
H. quadrum (Fabricius, 1805)
H. refusa (Giglio-tos, 1893)
H. reversio (Harris, 1780)
H. rubripalpis (van der Wulp, 1896)
H. rufitibia (Stein, 1898)
H. sera (Gitlio-tos, 1893)
H. setifer Huckett, 1965
H. setiventris Ringdahl, 1924
H. sexmaculata (Preyssler, 1791)
H. signatipennis (van der Wulp, 1896)
H. snyderi Steyskal, 1966
H. socia (van der Wulp, 1896)
H. spinicosta (Zetterstedt, 1845)
H. spinilamellata Malloch, 1920
H. spinosa (Walker, 1849)
H. spuria Malloch, 1920
H. squalens (Zetterstedt, 1838)
H. steini Pont, 1988
H. subvittata (Séguy, 1923)
H. tarsalis (Stein, 1918)
H. tetrastigma (Meigen, 1826)
H. toga Snyder, 1949
H. trivittata (Zetterstedt, 1860)
H. troene (Walker, 1849)
H. ute Snyder, 1949
H. vicina (Czerny, 1900)
H. villihumilis Snyder, 1949

References

Muscidae
Diptera of North America
Diptera of Europe
Brachycera genera
Taxa named by Jean-Baptiste Robineau-Desvoidy